The Southern Tiwa language is a Tanoan language spoken at Sandia Pueblo and Isleta Pueblo in New Mexico and Ysleta del Sur in Texas.

Genealogical relations

Southern Tiwa belongs to the Tiwa sub-grouping of the Kiowa–Tanoan language family. It is closely related to the more northernly Picurís (spoken at Picuris Pueblo) and Taos (spoken at Taos Pueblo). Trager stated that Southern Tiwa speakers were able to understand Taos and Picurís, although Taos and Picurís speakers could not understand Southern Tiwa very easily. Harrington (1910) observed that an Isleta person (Southern Tiwa) communicated in "Mexican jargon" with Taos speakers as Taos and Southern Tiwa were not mutually intelligible.

Language variation

Southern Tiwa had three dialectal variants
 Sandía
 Isleta
 Ysleta del Sur (Tigua)

Trager reported that Sandía and Isleta were very similar and mutually intelligible.

In August 2015, it was announced that the Tiwa language would be taught to children at Isleta Elementary School in Pueblo of Isleta, as a part of the school's transfer from federal to tribal control.

Sound system

Southern Tiwa has 26 consonants:

{|class="wikitable" style="text-align: center"
|+Consonants
|-
! colspan="2" rowspan="2" |
! rowspan="2" | Bilabial
! rowspan="2" | Dental
! rowspan="2" |Alveolar
! rowspan="2" |Lateral
! rowspan="2" | Palatal
! colspan="2" | Velar
! colspan="2" | Glottal
|- class="small" !
!plain
!lab.
!plain
!lab.
|-
! rowspan="4" | Plosive
! voiced
| 
| 
|
|
|
| 
|
|
|
|-
! voiceless
| 
| 
|
|
|
| 
|kʷ
| 
|
|-
!aspirated
|pʰ
|tʰ
|
|
|
|kʰ
|
|
|
|-
!glottalized
|pʼ
|tʼ
|
|
|
|kʼ
|kʼʷ
|
|
|-
! rowspan="2" | Affricate
!voiceless
|
|
|
|
| 
|
|
|
|
|-
!glottalized
|
|
|
|
|ʼ
|
|
|
|
|-
! colspan="2" | Fricative
|f
|
|
| 
|ʃ
|
|
| 
|hʷ
|-
! colspan="2" | Trill
|
|
| r
|
|
|
|
|
|
|-
! colspan="2" | Nasal
| 
| 
|
|
|
|
|
|
|
|-
! colspan="2" | Approximant
| 
|
|
| 
| 
|
|
|
|
|} Stops /pʰ, tʰ, kʰ/ and /b, d/ may be fricated in different positions as [f, θ, x] and [β, ð] respectively.

Southern Tiwa has six vowels that have both an oral and nasal contrast.

{| class="wikitable" style="text-align: center"
|+ Vowels
! rowspan="2" |
! colspan="2" | Front
! colspan="2" |Central
! colspan="2" | Back
|- style="font-size: small;"
! oral
! nasal
!oral
!nasal
! oral
! nasal
|-
! High
| 
| ĩ
|ɨ
|ɨ̃
| 
| ũ
|-
! Mid
| e
| ẽ
|
|
|
|
|-
! Low
| 
| 
|a
|ã
|
|
|}
Southern Tiwa has three tones: high, mid, and low.

References

Bibliography

 Allen, Barbara J. (1978). Goal advancement in Southern Tiwa. SIL working papers (No. 22). Summer Institute of Linguistics and University of North Dakota.
 Allen, Barbara J.; & Frantz, Donald G. (1978). Verb agreement in Southern Tiwa. In Proceedings of the fourth annual meeting of the Berkeley Linguistics Society (pp. 11–17).
 Allen, Barbara J.; & Frantz, Donald G. (1983). An impersonal passive in Southern Tiwa. SIL working papers (No. 25). Summer Institute of Linguistics and University of North Dakota.
 Allen, Barbara J.; Frantz, Donald G.; & Gardiner, Donna B. (1981). Phantom arcs in Southern Tiwa. SIL working papers (No. 27). Summer Institute of Linguistics and University of North Dakota.
 Allen, Barbara J.; & Gardiner, Donna B. (1981). Passive in Southern Tiwa. In Proceedings of the ninth annual Southwestern Areal Language and Linguistic Workshop.
 Allen, Barbara J.; Gardiner, Donna B.; & Frantz, Donald G. (1984). Noun incorporation in Southern Tiwa. International Journal of American Linguistics, 50 (3), 292-311.
 Brandt, Elizabeth. (1970). Sandia Pueblo, New Mexico: A linguistics and ethnolinguistic investigation. (Doctoral dissertation, Southern Methodist University).
 Brandt, Elizabeth. (1970). On the origins of linguistic stratification: The Sandia case. Anthropological Linguistics, 12 (2), 46-50.
 Gardiner, Donna. (1977). Embedded questions in Southern Tiwa. (Master's thesis, University of North Dakota).
 Gatschet, Albert. (1891). A mythic tale of the Isleta Indians, New Mexico. Proceedings of the American Philosophical Society, 29, 208-218.
 Harrington, J. P. (1909). Notes on the Piro language. American Anthropologist, 11 (4), 563-594.
 Leap, William L. (1970). The language of Isleta, New Mexico. (Doctoral dissertation, Southern Methodist University).
 Leap, William L. (1970). Tiwa noun class semology: A historical view. Anthropological Linguistics, 12 (2), 38-45.
 Lummis, C. (1910). Pueblo Indian folk stories. New York: The Century Co.
 Sutton, Logan D. (2014). Kiowa-Tanoan: A Synchronic and Diachronic Study. The University of New Mexico, Albuquerque.
 Trager, George L. (1942). The historical phonology of the Tiwa languages. Studies in Linguistics, 1 (5), 1-10.
 Trager, George L. (1943). The kinship and status terms of the Tiwa languages. American Anthropologist, 45 (1), 557-571.
 Trager, George L. (1946). An outline of Taos grammar. In C. Osgood (Ed.), Linguistic structures in North America (pp. 184–221).  New York: Wenner-Green Foundation for Anthropological Research. 
 Yumitani, Yukihiro. (1987). A Comparative Sketch of Pueblo Languages: Phonology, Kansas Working Papers in Linguistics, Vol. 12, 135-139.

External links

 UH Documentation Project: Tiwa

Tanoan languages
Indigenous languages of New Mexico
Indigenous languages of Texas
Indigenous languages of the Southwestern United States
Indigenous languages of the North American Southwest